Hard Boiled is a 1992 Hong Kong action thriller film directed by John Woo from a screenplay by Gordon Chan and Barry Wong. The film stars Chow Yun-fat as Inspector "Tequila" Yuen, Tony Leung Chiu-wai as Alan, an undercover cop, and Anthony Wong as Johnny Wong, a leader of the criminal triads.

The film was John Woo's last Hong Kong film before his transition to Hollywood. After making films that glamorized gangsters and receiving criticism for doing so, Woo wanted to make a Dirty Harry styled film to glamorize the police. With the death of screenwriter Barry Wong, the film's screenplay underwent constant changes during filming. New characters such as Mad Dog and Mr. Woo were introduced, while the original plotline of a baby-poisoning psychopath was cut.

Hard Boiled was released in Hong Kong in 1992 to generally positive audience reception, but was not as commercially successful as Woo's previous films such as A Better Tomorrow and The Killer. Reception from Western critics was much more positive, with many critics and film scholars describing its action scenes as being among the best ever filmed. In 2007, a video game sequel titled Stranglehold was released.

Plot 
In a teahouse in Hong Kong, Royal Hong Kong Police inspectors "Tequila" Yuen and Benny Mak attempt to arrest a group of gun smugglers while they are making a deal. After an ambush from a rival gang, a fierce gun battle breaks out; the gangsters are defeated but several police officers are badly wounded and Benny is killed. As revenge, Tequila executes the gangster who killed Benny rather than arrest him, much to the chagrin of his superintendent Pang. Tequila is then ordered off the case for his misdeed.

Meanwhile, Alan, an assassin under the employ of Triad boss "Uncle" Hoi, murders one of his subordinates who had double-crossed their clan for a rival syndicate led by upstart Johnny Wong. Wong, who is looking to usurp the old Triad bosses through his control of the illicit arms trade, is impressed by Alan's skill and attempts to recruit him. Alan reluctantly accepts the offer, and Wong brings Alan to a raid on Hoi's warehouse, where many of Hoi's men are killed.

Hoi is eventually cornered, and allows Alan to kill him in exchange for the safety of his men. After Alan shoots him, he kills the rest of his men regardless. Tequila then comes out from hiding and attacks all of Wong's men, but Alan spares Tequila's life in the chaos. Pang confirms to Tequila that Alan is an undercover cop. Tequila tracks Alan down to his sailboat to try to make sense of the situation, but the two are ambushed by the remnants of Hoi's gang.

Tequila and Alan manage to kill their attackers just before Wong arrives, allowing Alan to keep his cover. Wong realizes that one of his lieutenants, Foxy, is a police informant. Foxy is beaten at the docks by Wong's henchman Mad Dog in front of Alan and Wong. Alan then shoots Foxy in the chest, although a cigar lighter he placed in his chest pocket earlier prevents the shot from being lethal. Foxy finds Tequila at a jazz bar and informs him that Wong's armory is hidden in a vault beneath a nearby hospital. As Tequila takes Foxy to the hospital, Wong discovers that Foxy is alive and sends Alan to kill him, then discreetly sends Mad Dog to monitor Alan. At the hospital, Alan confronts Tequila, demanding to know the whereabouts of the vault. While the two are distracted, Foxy is killed by Mad Dog.

Alan and Tequila discover a hidden passage in the hospital leading to Wong's vault where they get into a gunfight with Mad Dog. As more police and gangsters arrive, Wong has several patients taken hostage. Mad Dog requests the hostages be released, but Wong refuses. After fighting their way to the main lobby, Alan and Tequila manage to save the hostages; Pang evacuates the lobby while officer Teresa Chang goes to the maternity ward to evacuate the babies. As Alan and Tequila continue fighting through the hospital, the duo eventually confront Mad Dog once again. While Tequila leaves to assist Chang with the babies, Alan and Mad Dog get into a tense shootout, before finding themselves in a standoff amidst several patients and staff. They offer the group safe passage, but Wong shoots at the group in a bid to kill Alan. Angered, Mad Dog turns on Wong, but finds himself out of ammo. Wong kills Mad Dog while Alan escapes.

Tequila manages to meet up with Alan, and the two are confronted by Wong, who sets off bombs within the building. Alan refuses to escape, choosing to pursue Wong, while Tequila jumps out of the hospital with wire cables as it explodes. Wong drags Alan outside at gunpoint as a hostage and has Tequila humiliate himself. With this distraction, Alan manages to grab Wong's pistol and shoot himself, giving Tequila the opportunity to shoot Wong dead, however Alan collapses from the aftermath.

Alan is revealed to have survived the ordeal. To protect Alan from the triads, Pang and Tequila destroy Alan's personnel file and declare him dead, allowing him to leave Hong Kong to start a new life.

Cast 

 Chow Yun-fat as Inspector "Tequila" Yuen Ho-yan: A clarinet-playing, alcoholic police sergeant with a reputation for defying his superiors and bending police rules. Chow had previously worked with director John Woo on several of his films, including A Better Tomorrow, The Killer and Once a Thief.
 Tony Leung Chiu-wai as Alan: An undercover cop posing as a high-ranking triad assassin. He makes an origami crane every time he kills someone, a trait which was influenced by Woo's daughter when he saw her making them. Alan is shown as living alone on a yacht and considers himself to be antisocial. Woo stated that this was influenced by Alain Delon's character in the French crime film Le Samouraï. Leung had previously worked with Woo on his film Bullet in the Head.
 Teresa Mo as Teresa Chang: A fellow police officer who is the girlfriend of Tequila. She helps to decode the secret code songs that are sent to the police by Alan written on cards attached to bouquets that he has delivered to her.  
 Philip Chan as Supt. Pang: Tequila's superior. Prior to the film, Chan was a police officer for about fifteen years. He felt that certain scenes in the film were very familiar as they were similar to real police work.
 Philip Kwok as Mad Dog: A skilled gunfighter and gang enforcer working for Johnny Wong.
 Anthony Wong as Johnny Wong: A scheming triad boss who plans to seize complete control of Hong Kong's gangs using the earnings from his gun smuggling business, most of which are stored in the basement of a hospital.
 Bowie Lam as Benny Mak: Tequila's long-time partner and fellow jazz musician. He dies in the opening shootout after accidentally killing a civilian.
 Anjo Leung as Benny's son.
 Bobby Au-yeung as Lionheart: An officer who works under Tequila's supervision.
 Kwan Hoi-san as "Uncle" Hoi: Alan's boss, an aging gangster who turns down an opportunity to leave Hong Kong as he considers it to be irresponsible. Alan is forced to kill him after Johnny takes control of his gun warehouse.
 Stephen Tung as Foxy: Johnny's lieutenant who secretly informs on his gang to Tequila. After he is exposed as a traitor, Alan intervenes to save his life. Foxy is later killed by Mad Dog at the hospital in which the final shoot-out takes place.
 John Woo as Bartender: A former cop who runs the jazz bar where Tequila performs and offers him advice.
 Jun Kunimura as Tea-House Gunman: A gun smuggler who kills Benny Mak at the teahouse and is subsequently gunned down by a vengeful Tequila. Credited as Y Yonemura in the film's opening credits

Production

Development 

The film was originally developed in 1990. After creating films which focused on the lives of gangsters, director John Woo wanted to make a film that glorified the police instead. Woo admired Clint Eastwood's and Steve McQueen's characters from their films Dirty Harry and Bullitt respectively, and wanted to make his own Hong Kong-style Dirty Harry police detective film. While creating this character, Woo was inspired by a police officer who was a strong-willed and tough member of the police force, as well as being an avid drummer. This led to Woo having Tequila's character be a musician as well as a cop.

Before production started, Woo told his actors that he was not going to make the film as stylish as his previous films, but to have it be more of an "edgy thriller". The role of Teresa Chang was originally made for actress Michelle Yeoh, who had a long relationship with producer Terence Chang. After casting Teresa Mo, the character of Teresa Chang was greatly re-written.
The film's initial story was about Tony Leung's character being a psychopath who would poison baby food. When Terence Chang was making connections to have Woo make films in the United States, Chang found people uninterested and disgusted with the theme of babies being poisoned. This halted production for a month to develop a new story. Screenwriter Barry Wong was brought in to write a new story about Tony Leung's character being an undercover police officer. After writing the first part of the script, Wong went on a vacation outside Hong Kong, where he died leaving the script unfinished.

Filming 
Hard Boiled took 123 days to shoot. Although Woo told his cast that the film would be more gritty and not as stylish as his previous films, Hard Boiled became more stylish as the filming began. The tea house sequence in the film was shot before the script was written. The crew found that the tea house was going to be torn down and decided to film a scene there. Woo saw the staircase in the tea house, and thought about a scene where a character would come shooting down gun smugglers while sliding down the banister. The tea house sequence was shot in around a week's time and was choreographed by Woo and Philip Kwok. It was shot with interruptions from many local triads in the area asking for protection money, and residents complaining about the noise.

The script of the film went through several changes during filming. Due to the length of the film, scenes from a side-story involving the relationship between the character Tequila and Teresa Chang were cut. Another cut scene included Tequila playing clarinet over Benny's grave. With these cuts, Chow Yun-fat felt his character was not very deep in comparison to Leung's character of Alan. To develop his character more, Chow asked John Woo to insert a mentor character in the film, which Woo himself would play; Chow felt that having Woo in this role would make Woo not cut out these scenes. Philip Kwok's role of Mad Dog was not in the script and was created on the set. Kwok first worked with Woo on his film Once a Thief and was asked to return to work on Hard Boiled. After reading the script, Woo felt that the character of Johnny Wong was not a strong enough physical threat. After seeing Kwok do several of the stunts while filming, Woo created the character of Mad Dog for him.

The scenes in the hospital maternity ward and the warehouse were shot at a new studio called "The Coca-Cola Factory" which was formerly a Coke bottling plant. The hospital scenes took 40 days to shoot. The hospital segment's location was chosen since they wanted to have an atypical location where gangs would hide their weapons. While filming in the hospital, the windows were covered with blast shields to give the appearance of night time, which allowed the crew to film at any time during the day. Members of the cast and crew stayed in the hospital for days often losing track of the time of day. After long hours of filming in the hospital, the crew became exhausted. This led to having the last scene be one long five-minute scene of action to shorten the time needed to film. To complete this, during the scene when two characters go into an elevator to talk for twenty seconds, the crew changes the scene entirely and sets up the explosions for the scene to continue seamlessly. An accident occurred while filming the hospital sequence. Real glass was used and pieces of it flew toward Tony Leung and got into his eyes. Leung was sent to the hospital and returned to the set after a week's rest. Woo changed the ending of Hard Boiled after many members of the crew of the film felt that Leung's character should survive at the film's end.

Post-production 
Woo is a fan of jazz music and wanted this style for the soundtrack of Hard Boiled. Woo had also previously wanted a singer to perform a jazz song and have Chow Yun-fat's character play saxophone in his previous film The Killer. The producer for The Killer, Tsui Hark, rejected this idea for The Killer, feeling that Hong Kong audiences didn't enjoy and understand jazz music. The score heard in Hard Boiled was created by jazz musician Michael Gibbs. During promotional screenings, the score for the film was different and was described as "very haunting music". This score could not be used as the production crew could not get the rights to the music. Other songs featured in the film, include "Hello" by Lionel Richie and the traditional song "Mona Lisa". Woo chose these songs specifically for their lyrics to suggest that Tony was a sort of pen pal to Teresa. All the characters in Hard Boiled had their voices dubbed by their own actors to save money. Woo stated this was convenient as he did not have to worry about setting up boom mics and other sound elements.

Release

Theatrical run 
Hard Boiled was released on 16 April 1992 in Hong Kong. The film grossed HK$19,711,048 which was not as strong of a box office reception as Woo's previous action films A Better Tomorrow or The Killer. On the film's initial release in Hong Kong it debuted at number 3 in the box office where it was beaten by Tsui Hark's Once Upon a Time in China 2 and the Stephen Chow film Fight Back to School II.

The North American premiere of Hard Boiled was in September 1992 at the Toronto International Film Festival. At the premiere, the audience response was very positive with people stomping their feet and yelling at the screen. This reception surprised producer Terence Chang who did not expect such a positive reaction. It had a limited US release in June 1993, grossing US$71,858. In France, it was released the same month and sold 85,104 tickets. Hard Boiled received a wide release in the United Kingdom on 8 October 1993.

Home media 
A laserdisc edition of Hard Boiled was released by The Criterion Collection in December 1995. A region free DVD of Hard Boiled was released by The Criterion Collection on 10 July 1998. A second Region 1 DVD of the film was released by Fox Lorber. Fox Lorber released the film as a stand-alone release and as a double feature with The Killer on 3 October 2000. Originally, when Miramax bought the rights to Hard Boiled, The Killer, and Bullet to the Head, they intended to release it in a cut version on video, it was until Woo prevented them from releasing it except Woo prefers his cut of his films to be released. The most recent Region 1 release of Hard Boiled was from Dragon Dynasty, who released a two disc DVD of the film on 24 July 2007.

Reception 

Initial reception to Hard Boiled was positive. Vincent Canby of The New York Times found it difficult to follow both the action scenes and the subtitles at the same time, but stated that "Mr. Woo does, in fact, seem to be a very brisk, talented director with a gift for the flashy effect and the bizarre confrontation." A review in the Los Angeles Times stated that "With Hard Boiled, John Woo shows himself to be the best director of contemporary action films anywhere."
The Philadelphia Inquirer spoke positively about the action scenes, noting the "epic shootouts that bookend Hard-Boiled, John Woo's blood-soaked Hong Kong gangster extravaganza, are wondrously staged, brilliantly photographed tableaux." The Boston Herald proclaimed the film as "arguably Woo's masterpiece, it is an action film to end all action films, an experience so deliriously cinematic it makes True Romance, a film that clearly aspires to it, look like a cheap copy"<ref>{{cite journal
| author      = Verniere, James
| date        = 10 September 1993
| title       = Movie Review 'Hard Boiled' a hard-core action film Hard Boiled
| journal     = Boston Herald
| pages       = s.10
| url         = https://pqasb.pqarchiver.com/bostonherald/access/68137407.html?dids=68137407:68137407&FMT=ABS&FMTS=ABS:FT&type=current&date=Sep+10,+1993&author=James+Verniere&pub=Boston+Herald&desc=Movie+Review+`Hard+Boiled'+a+hard-core+action+film+``Hard+Boiled&pqatl=google
| access-date  = 6 August 2010
}}</ref> A review in Newsday gave the film three and a half stars, stating that "Mayhem has never looked better than in John Woo's latest high-caliber cops-and-robbers thriller, even if the plot is a bit slippery" and that John Woo "has blasted the action genre onto a whole new level. His shootouts are a ballet; his firebombings are poetry. And while he lets the body count get away from him, he constantly fascinates, through a combination of chaos and an excruciating control over what we're allowed to see."

After the film's initial release, critical reception continues to be positive; the review-aggregation website Rotten Tomatoes gives it a score of 94%, with an average rating of 7.79 out of 10, based on 35 reviews. The website's "Critic's Consensus" for the film reads, "Boasting impactful action as well as surprising emotional resonance, Hard Boiled is a powerful thriller that hits hard in more ways than one." Film scholar Andy Klein wrote that the film is "almost a distillation of [Woo's] post-1986 work. Even if the plot is full of holes, and the emotional tug isn't quite as strong as in The Killer, the action sequences (nearly the whole movie) are among the greatest ever filmed".Heard, 1999. p.103 Mark Salisbury of Empire Magazine gave the film four stars out of five, calling it "Infinitely more exciting than a dozen Die Hards, action cinema doesn't come any better than this." Salisbury compared Hard Boiled to Woo's American films, stating that his Hong Kong films are "not as slick as his later films, [Hard Boiled is] more inventive and stylised and [has] great early performances from Fat and Leung". Empire placed the film at number 70 in their list of "The 100 Best Films Of World Cinema" in 2010. Ed Gonzalez of Slant Magazine gave the film the highest rating of four stars, proclaiming it to be one of Woo's best films. The British film magazine Empire ranked the character of Tequila as 33rd in their "The 100 Greatest Movie Characters" poll.

Accolades
At the 12th Hong Kong Film Awards, David Wu and John Woo won the award for "Best Film Editing". Tony Leung was nominated for "Best Supporting Male Actor", but he refused the nomination on the grounds that he had a leading role in the film. His protest was supported by John Woo and Chow Yun-fat. This later led the Hong Kong Film Awards to change its nomination rules to allow for multiple leading roles from the same film.

 Video game 

In 2007, Midway Games released the game Stranglehold. The game's story and storyboards were made in collaboration with John Woo. The game features the character Tequila from Hard Boiled'', who is travelling the globe in search of his kidnapped daughter. In 2009 John Woo's production company Lion Rock Entertainment was reported to be developing a film version of the game, to be written by Jeremy Passmore and Andre Fabrizio.

See also 
 Chow Yun-fat filmography
 Hong Kong action cinema
 Hong Kong films of 1992
 List of action films of the 1990s

References

Bibliography

External links 

 
 
 
 
Hard Boiled an essay by Barbara Scharres at the Criterion Collection

1992 films
1992 action thriller films 
1990s police procedural films
1990s Cantonese-language films
Films directed by John Woo
Films set in Hong Kong
Films set in hospitals
Hong Kong films about revenge
Hong Kong action thriller films 
Hong Kong New Wave films
Police detective films 
Triad films
1990s Hong Kong films